Belmont High School is a four-year public high school in Belmont, Massachusetts, United States. The new school building was opened in 2021. The school had 1,309 students enrolled and a student/teacher ratio of 16.8:1 in the 2020–2021 school year. The second part of the building, which will serve as the Belmont Middle School, is scheduled to open in the fall of 2023. 

Belmont High is ranked #211 in the National Rankings and #6 in Massachusetts by USNews, and also earned a gold medal.

Buildings and facilities 

The school is built on an old landfill and is situated next to Clay Pit Pond. The town's high school used to be located on Orchard Street, but was badly damaged by fire in 1967. A new school was eventually built at the current location on 221 Concord Avenue in Belmont, MA. The previous high school re-opened as the Roger Wellington elementary school in and was entirely demolished in February–March 2010 for reconstruction. In 2019, the construction of the new Belmont Middle and High School building began, with the first half of the new school for grades 9-12 opening in September 2021. The project should be finished by August 2023.

Administration and faculty

Belmont High School administration consists of the principal, Mr. Isaac Taylor and three assistant principals, Elizabeth Gavin, Sarah Winn, and Daniel O'Brien. 

In June 2004, the school's long-time principal, Foster Wright, retired. Jonathan Landman was hired to replace him, but the school department did not renew Landman's contract for the 2006–2007 school year. Michael Harvey, who had been among the candidates for principal in 2004, was selected as an "interim principal" for the 2006–2007 school year, and, on January 10, 2007, was approved by the town as principal. He had been the director of social studies during the previous school year. In addition, one of the school's two assistant principals has left the system in June 2003, 2004, 2005, 2006, 2010, and 2011. In 2012, when Harvey left to become superintendent of the Hamilton-Wenham schools, former-assistant-principal Daniel Richards took his place. Richards had spent his last year as the Principal of Melrose High and had been replaced by David Smokler. When Richards returned, Smokler kept his position temporarily before being permanently replaced by the Head of Guidance, Jim Brown.

The school has eight academic departments: Mathematics, English, Foreign Language, Social Studies, Science, Fine and Performing Arts, and Athletics. Each department consists of a department head, along with the teachers of the courses the department offers. The Guidance Department is responsible for the mental well-being of students, schedule composition, and college planning. Each student is assigned to a guidance counselor.

School hours and schedule
School is in session each day between 8:00am and 2:25pm except for Wednesdays, which conclude at 12:40 pm.

Belmont High School operates on a non-traditional module-based schedule. There are 15 modules ("mods") each day, each of which is approximately 25 minutes long. There are also blocks of "pass time" between most mods, which are usually 3 minutes in length, and are meant to give students time to walk from one class to another.

Each mod is named with a letter and a number. The letter corresponds the time of the mod (A is the earliest and spans 7:35am – 7:59am. O is the latest, and spans 2:00pm – 2:25pm). The number corresponds to the day, with Monday being 1 and Friday being 5. Thus, for example, C3 is the time period 8:27am – 8:52am on Wednesdays.

Most classes meet four times per week for three 2-mod sessions (a "double") and one 3-mod session (a "triple"). The day that the class does not meet is called a "drop". On Wednesdays, school is dismissed at 1:30pm for most students, meaning that only 13 mods are held, with the last two mods of the day being "free" for teacher meetings. Additionally, all classes are shortened by a few minutes to compensate for the fact that the mod usually ends at 1:33pm, not 1:30pm.

As a result of this mod schedule, each student's schedule is unique to the classes he or she is taking. Students who do not have a class assigned during a mod are "free". Seniors are permitted, by school policy, to leave campus during this time if they have met the required criteria for the privilege. Juniors also have access to this policy. While no classes are scheduled for only one mod, it is possible to have only one mod free. A student who takes six classes will have 20 free mods per week, while those who take Wellness I or Positive Decision Making will have 16 free mods per week.

A student's schedule is based on a master schedule, which states when certain mods have triples, drops, etc. As a result, it is fairly easy to describe one's schedule using a list of variations from the master schedule.

Courses and graduation requirements

The school requires that all students complete:
 4 years of English
 4 years of Mathematics
 4 years of Science
 3 years of Social Studies
 2 years of Foreign Language
 1 year of Fine and Performing Arts
 4 years of Physical Education and Health

A number of Advanced Placement (AP), or college-level class are offered to prepare the students for the AP exams in May. Based on the results of its AP exams, Belmont High School is, on the U.S. News & World Report list of the top 100 high schools in the United States. It occupies the #100 position on that list, and holds the second-highest ranking of any Massachusetts school on the list (behind the Boston Latin School, the oldest public school in the nation), and holds the highest ranking of any Massachusetts school that does not require an entrance exam.

English
Starting in 2007-2008, all students are required to take an English course each year. Based on grade, the student may take English 9, English 10, English 11, and either English 12 or AP English Literature. English 9-12 are offered at college preparatory (CP) or honors (H) levels.

In the past, Belmont High School has, instead of English 12H, offered two humanities classes in place of English 12 and other English electives, although these are no longer offered.

Social studies
All students are required to take World History, Modern World History, and American Studies, all of which are offered at either a college preparatory (CP) or honors (H) level. Students can replace Modern World History with AP World History:Modern, and can also replace American Studies with AP United States History. Electives such as AP Economics, You and the Law, and Global Leadership are also offered to interested students. In addition, the Social Studies department also offers AP Psychology, which can be supplemented by an Honors-level Neurobiology elective.

Mathematics
All students are required to take 4 math courses. Most students take, in order, Geometry, Algebra II, Pre-calculus, and Calculus, though some students select other options, including:

 Some take Algebra I freshman year, but most take Geometry during their first year. Those who choose the former usually end with Pre-calculus.
 Calculus during the junior year of high school, and participating in either an independent study (typically a course at the Harvard Extension School) during their senior year.
 Substituting either Calculus or Pre-calculus with Math Big Decision.

In addition, the Mathematics Department also offers several electives, such as AP Stats, which can be taken instead of an independent study for a student who took Calculus their junior year.

Geometry, Algebra II, and Pre-calculus are offered at either a college preparatory (CP) or honors (H) level. Algebra I and all electives are only offered as CP classes. Calculus is offered at three levels: one H class and two classes to prepare students for either the AP Calculus AB exam or the AP Calculus BC exam.

Science
All students are required to take, in order, Physics, Chemistry, and Biology, all of which are offered as CP and honors courses, and, in the case of Biology, AP in the first year. In addition, students must take at least one elective. Potential electives include AP Chemistry, AP Biology, AP Physics 1, AP Environmental Science, Disease and Forensics, Science Ethics, and AP Psychology / Neurobiology.

Foreign languages
Two years of foreign language are required, though many students opt to take more. Students may take courses in Mandarin Chinese, Spanish, French, or Latin. AP language classes are available, typically in students' senior year, and include AP Chinese, AP Spanish, AP French, and AP Latin. Independent studies may also be offered in German. Exchange programs exist to Argentina, France, and Italy.

Fine and performing arts
Belmont High School offers many fine and performing arts courses. This includes many choirs, the wind ensemble, the symphonic band, string orchestra, the chamber orchestra, the jazz band, and the marching band. Many of the members of these ensembles are nationally recognized musicians, and the ensembles themselves have won extensive state and country-wide competitions. It is known as one of the top 100 public school music programs in the country. It offers classes in theater including multiple Acting courses and has a strong theatre program in the form of an after school extra-curricular organization known as the Performing Arts Company (PAC). In addition, a vigorous AP Art program gives student artists an opportunity to develop their talents and study new techniques. Fine art courses include Drawing and Painting, 3D Art, Sculpture, Ceramics, Photography, Digital Art, Media Arts II, and Animation.

Physical education
All students are required to take the half-year, one-semester Wellness I during their freshman year, which is both a traditional PE class and a health/sex-ed class (parents can exclude their children from the sex-ed classes if they so choose). Additionally, students must take Positive Decision Making during their sophomore year, which is also a one semester class. During their remaining years at school, students are required to fulfill two semesters of PE, which they can obtain either by playing a school-offered sport, joining certain clubs, taking 1 or more PE electives, or doing PE outside of school. All non-school-offered PE activities require a "contract" with the Athletics Department.

School demographics

Extracurricular activities and sports

Sports
Belmont High School is part of the Middlesex League and the Massachusetts Interscholastic Athletic Association.

The school colors are maroon and blue.  The school mascot is the Marauder, which is a pirate.

The high school's athletic department offers 29 sports with 61 levels of competition:

Fall sports
 Cheerleading (V, JV)
 Cross country - boys, girls (V, JV)
 Field hockey (V, JV, F)
 Football (V, JV, F)
 Golf (V)
 Soccer—boys, girls (V, JV, F)
 Swimming—girls (V, JV)
 Volleyball—girls (V, JV, F)
Winter sports
 Basketball - boys, girls (V, JV, F)
 Ice hockey - boys, girls (V, JV)
 Skiing - boys, girls (V, JV)
 Swimming - boys (V, JV)
 Indoor track - boys, girls (V, JV)
 Wrestling (V, JV)
 Cheerleading (V)
Spring sports
 Baseball (V, JV, F)
 Lacrosse - boys, girls (V, JV)
 Rugby - boys, girls (V, JV)
 Softball (V, JV, F)
 Spring track - boys, girls (V, JV)
 Tennis - boys, girls (V, JV)

Clubs
The clubs range from various science clubs to theatrical organizations and civil rights groups, as well as various hobby enthusiasts. The majority of students participate in at least one or more clubs throughout the school year, as there are many types of clubs that appeal to different preferences. For example, some athletic clubs include soccer club, strength training club, and rock climbing club while other clubs are more academically-oriented, such as Model UN, math team, science team, Latin club, computer science club, and debate team. There are also several community-based organizational clubs, such as PALS, the Belmontian Club, UNICEF, and Relay for Life.

Clubs are usually started (or at least led) by students, with a staff member serving as an adviser.

In the spring of 2011, the Belmont Rugby Football Club (BRFC) won the Division 2 Massachusetts High School Rugby State championship, and won the Div. 1 championship in 2013. The team participated in the championship game for three consecutive years (2013-2015). Belmont High Girls Rugby won the first-ever state championship in the sport defeating Algonquin Regional High School, 17-14, on June 10, 2017. It is also the first time in the US a state interscholastic body sponsored a rugby title.

Some other sport clubs include the ultimate frisbee team and crew club. The ultimate frisbee team is based in Lexington, MA and the team competes in the Boston Ultimate Disc Alliance (BUDA) Youth Club U-17 division. They placed 3rd Place at MA State Championships (2019) and 2nd Place at MA State Championships (2018). The crew club is based in Arlington, MA and combines students from Belmont High School, Arlington High School, and Minuteman Regional Vocational Technical High School. Initially, the Arlington-Belmont Crew Club started as Belmont Crew in 2005. The club now practices and races in both the spring and fall rowing seasons, with a training season in the winter. The team has won 6 trophies for three consecutive years (2012-2014) and 12 trophies in 2015, and currently holds the Girls Novice 8+ trophy in the 2019 State Championships Regatta. The club has competed in the Head of the Charles River regatta since 2010, except for 2020 due to the virtual format.

Supplementary education
The Lexington Chinese School (LCS; 勒星頓中文學校) holds its classes at Belmont High. In 2003 over 400 students attended classes at LCS, held on Sundays.

Notable alumni

Emily Cook, US Olympian - 2002, 2006, and 2010.
Robert F. Foley, retired United States Army lieutenant general, Medal of Honor recipient
Robbie Guertin, guitarist, tambourinist, Clap Your Hands Say Yeah
Michael Bivins, singer, Bell Biv Devoe, New Edition.
Masako Owada, Empress of Japan (class of 1981)
Mike Palm, MLB pitcher
Becca Pizzi, marathon runner
Jean Rogers, actress who starred in the original Flash Gordon serials
Patty Shea, champion field hockey player and coach, member of the US Olympic team in 1988 and 1996 (class of 1980) 
Wilbur Wood, MLB pitcher
Christopher Loria, retired NASA astronaut
Merrill Barnes (class of 2019), who swam across Clay Pit Pond adjacent to Belmont High School during the school day while his classmates cheered him on and earned legendary status amongst his fellow classmates and friends.  Merrill jokingly told his friends he wanted to be buried in the toxic waters of Clay Pit Pond upon his death.  Sadly, that day came all too soon, as Merrill passed away unexpectedly on March 11, 2023.  We love and miss you, Merrill.

References

External links
Official website

Public high schools in Massachusetts
Belmont, Massachusetts
Educational institutions established in 1865
Schools in Middlesex County, Massachusetts
School buildings completed in 1970
1865 establishments in Massachusetts